Chah Zangi may refer to:
 Chah Zangi, Bushehr
 Chah Zangi, Kerman